HMS Traveller (N48) was a T-class submarine of the Royal Navy. She was laid down by Scotts, Greenock and launched in August 1941.

Career
Traveller spent most of her career serving in the Mediterranean. She also claimed to have attacked two so far unidentified submarines.

Traveller left Malta on 28 November 1942 for a patrol in the Gulf of Taranto. She carried out a reconnaissance of Taranto harbour for a Chariot human torpedo attack (Operation Principal). The submarine did not return from the operation and was reported overdue on 12 December. She probably struck an Italian mine on or about 4 December.

During the War Traveller was adopted by the Borough of Leyton in London as part of Warship Week. The plaque from this adoption is held by the National Museum of the Royal Navy in Portsmouth.

References

Publications
 
 
 

 

British T-class submarines of the Royal Navy
Ships built on the River Clyde
1941 ships
World War II submarines of the United Kingdom
World War II shipwrecks in the Mediterranean Sea
Lost submarines of the United Kingdom
Maritime incidents in December 1942
Ships lost with all hands